was a Japanese samurai of the Katakura clan during the late Sengoku period. Also known by his court title, Bichū no Kami (備中守), or more commonly, as Katakura Kojūrō. Together with Oniniwa Tsunamoto and Date Shigezane, Kagetsuna was known as one of the "Three Great Men of the Date Clan".

Early life
Kagetsuna was the son of Yonezawa native Katakura Kagenaga (a Shinto priest turned samurai), he was famed for his role as a senior retainer under Date Masamune. 

Kagetsuna was trained by his half sister, Katakura Kita, who played a crucial role in the success of the Katakura clan. He first served the Date clan as a junior page under Date Masamune's father Terumune. Then, on Endō Motonobu's recommendation, he became Masamune's personal attendant, and was heavily relied upon as a strategist. Kagetsuna would soon become deeply trusted by his lord, as the following anecdote illustrates: Masamune, in his first battle, suddenly found himself surrounded; he was only saved when Kagetsuna arrived on the scene shouting "I am Masamune!" (われこそが政宗なり; Ware koso ga Masamune nari), distracting the enemy long enough for Masamune to escape.

Military life
Kagetsuna fought in most of Masamune's major battles, including the Battle of Hitotoribashi in 1586, Battle of Koriyama in 1588, Battle of Suriagehara in 1589, Kunohe Rebellion in 1590, the Korean campaign in 1592, and Sekigahara in 1600. 

He also assisted in the Date clan's administrative duties, serving as castle warden of Nihonmatsu Castle, lord of Ōmori Castle, Watari Castle, and others. Kagetsuna played a key role in the survival of the Date clan in 1590, by recommending that Masamune submit to Toyotomi Hideyoshi during the Odawara Campaign. Following the Odawara Campaign, Hideyoshi granted Kagetsuna the 50,000 koku fief of Tamura. This made Kagetsuna a daimyō in his own right; however, soon after taking possession of the fief, he returned it, in a show of loyalty to his master.

Later, two years after Sekigahara, when Masamune was made lord of Sendai, Kagetsuna was granted Shiroishi Castle (白石城 Shiroishi-jō), and a stipend of 13,000 koku. This was a special exception to the Tokugawa Shogunate's newly passed ikkoku ichijō (一国一城; "One Castle per Territory") rule. The Katakura clan, as senior retainers of the Sendai domain, would remain in Shiroishi as local lords for the next two centuries, spanning over 11 generations.

As Kagetsuna was ill, he was unable to join Masamune at the Osaka Winter Campaign of 1614, choosing to send his son Shigenaga in his stead. Later he participated at the Osaka Summer Campaign in 1615.

Death
Kagetsuna died the following year at age 60, and was buried with the posthumous name of Sanzan Jōei (傑山常英). Upon Kagetsuna's death, six of his retainers were so deeply grieved that they committed junshi (殉死; suicide to follow one's lord in death).

Kagetsuna's son Shigenaga, taking part in the fierce fighting against Gotō Mototsugu at the Osaka Summer Campaign, earned the nickname Oni Kojūrō (鬼小十郎; "Ogre Kojūrō").

Family
 Father: Katakura Kagenaga
 Mother: Motosawa Yukinao’s daughter
 Wife: Yanouchi Shigesada’s daughter
 Concubine: Uehara Gohee’s daughter
 Children:
 daughter
 Katakura Shigenaga by Yanouchi Shigesada’s daughter
 Katakura Tomotsuna by Uehara Gohee’s daughter
 Katakura Yukitsuna by Yanouchi Shigesada’s daughter
 daughter

In fiction
In NHK's 1987 Taiga drama Dokuganryū Masamune, Kagetsuna was played by Teruhiko Saigō.

Notes

External links
"TEN-CHI-JIN" General of UESUGI Clan NAOE KANETSUGU - (Japanese)-Kabuto(Samurai Helmet) Papercraft

Daimyo
Samurai
1557 births
1615 deaths
Japanese pages
Karō
Katakura clan
Date retainers